The Southern Wrestling Hall of Fame (originally the Texas Wrestling Hall of Fame) is a professional wrestling hall of fame maintained by Iconic Heroes of Wrestling Excellence (IHWE). Established in 2009 to honor select wrestling personalities, inductees were initially limited to alumni of the Global Wrestling Federation, National Wrestling Alliance, USWA Texas, and World Class Championship Wrestling, but also included independent stars after 2011. In 2015, the hall of fame expanded to include wrestling personalities from all of the Southern United States.

It is the first and only hall of fame created to honor pro wrestling personalities in Texas wrestling. David Fuller, founder of the Texas Wrestling Hall of Fame, was partly inspired by the National Wrestling Hall of Fame and Museum in Waterloo, Iowa. He has also stated his admiration for the Professional Wrestling Hall of Fame and Museum in Amsterdam, New York and hoped that the Texas Wrestling Hall of Fame would have a physical building if they were able to get funding in the future. The Hall of Fame has been endorsed by Cauliflower Alley Club and a number of other wrestling personalities. Fuller was subsequently honored by the organization.  Fuller has said that one of his goals in starting the Texas Wrestling Hall of Fame was to bring attention to Texas-area independent stars and promotions.

Induction ceremonies
The induction ceremony for the Class of 2009, the inaugural inductees into the Hall of Fame, took place in Dallas, Texas on January 1, 2009. Slick, the first African-American manager in the World Wrestling Federation, led the class, which also included wrestler Chico Torres. On April 17, 2010, the Class of 2010 was inducted into the Hall of Fame. Wrestler Johnny Valentine's induction led the Class of 2010, followed by longtime ring announcer Rob Moore. Valentine's award was accepted by his widow, Sharon Valentine, and was the last public appearance before her death.

The Class of 2011 was led by Skandor Akbar. He was originally to be presented the award at an IHWE event on December 4, 2010 but died prior to the event. Akbar's nephew, Jerry Cluey, accepted the award on behalf of his late uncle. Other inductees included Kit Carson, Rodney Mack, Matt Borne, Larry Green, and Johnny T. The "Battle Box", a hardcore wrestling match invented by XCW, was also recognized at the show. During the following Hall of Fame ceremony on April 21, 2012 at the Dixie House Cafe in Fort Worth, Texas, Kamala led the Class of 2012. Jazz, Krusher Kong, Prince Al Farat, and Spoiler 2000 were also inducted that year. Both the famed Dallas Sportatorium and the Texas Wrestling Academy were honored at the event.

The 5th-annual Texas Wrestling Hall of Fame ceremony was held in Fort Worth on March 16, 2013. Bruiser Brody led the Class of 2013. Brody was formerly inducted by Rob Moore who presented the award to longtime friend Stan "The Lariat" Hansen on behalf of Brody's widow Barbara Goodish. Also inducted that year were Black Bart, Canyon Lindley, referee James Beard, and posthumous inductees Killer Karl Kox and Rick Davidson. Bob Murphy's Texas All-Star Wrestling, the oldest promotion in the state, were honored for their contributions to Texas independent wrestling. The organization also conducted an interview with Kevin Von Erich who discussed his thoughts on the 2013 Class. The 2014 HOF ceremony was held on March 15, 2014. The Class of 2014 was led by Stan Hansen followed by Terry "Bam Bam" Gordy, Gary Young, posthumous inductees Ray Evans and Awesome Kong, Khris Germany, Todd Diamond, referee Rick Manning, and Gary Tool. Skandor Akbar's Devastation Incorporated was also inducted into the hall of fame. The 2014 Hall of Fame ceremony was filmed for the first time and released to the public on YouTube.com.

The Texas Wrestling Hall of Fame ceremony has traditionally been closed to the general public. The decision to exclude wrestling fans was originally to respect the privacy of inductees and their families during the small private banquet. The organizer, David Fuller, was also concerned the event could be seen as opportunism on his part. Given that other wrestling hall of fame and memorial shows on the independent circuit have commonly been used to "cash in" on popular wrestling stars, the HOF ceremonies are strictly non-profit events. In the case of posthumous inductees, no wrestler is inducted without the blessing of the families and that a friend or family member is there to accept the award.

The Hall of Fame ceremonies have typically featured special guests, often former inductees, who have given speeches during the event. Matt Borne, a 2011 inductee, was scheduled to attend the 2014 edition but died before the event. The organizers decided to honor the late wrestler with a special memorial induction into the Texas HOF. Borne's wife and two children flew down from Pittsburgh to attend. Kansas City artist Rob Schamberger donated portraits to inductees and their families.

In  September 2014 IHWE during its biggest show of the year Old School Hustle at the Cendera Center in Fort Worth, Tx. The Grappler Len Denton &  Jim Cornette were both honored into the Hall of Fame by James Beard. Several Hall of Fame inductees were present for the honor, Barbara Goodish, Stan Hansen, Kit Carson, Khris Germany, Todd Hecht, Rick Manning, Black Bart. Morgan Dollar the Executive Vice President of the Cauliflower Alley Club was also on hand & announced after the induction of Cornette that at the 50th CAC the following year the CAC Would honor Bruiser Brody with a posthumous honor as Barbara Goodish then spoke to the sold-out crowd.

Future plans
As the awards have generated interest from Texas wrestling fans in recent years, Fuller has stated he will work on turning it into a larger event. The main obstacle to this, however, was that the event had now outgrown its older venues and would need to move to a much larger venue in order to accommodate fans. The restaurant hosting the 2014 HOF dinner, for example, was standing room only with both floors filled to capacity. A day after the 2014 HOF, Fuller speculated on whether to open the event to the public or to hold a wrestling convention either before or after the event.

Each HOF ceremony is limited to ten or so inductions per year. As of 2014, there have been a total of 32 inductees: 29 members inducted individually, one wrestling "gimmick" match, one stable and one wrestling family. Matt Borne is the only Hall of Famer to be inducted twice, first individually in 2011, then as posthumously in 2014. Eight members were inducted posthumously.

An official panel to oversee the selection process will be formed in 2015 and will include former WCCW referee James Beard and XCW promoter Nite Davis. Shortly before the 2014 HOF, founder David Fuller announced that the Von Erich family would be the first inductees of the Class of 2015.

Inductees

Footnotes 

 – Entries without a birth name indicates that the inductee did not perform under a ring name.
 – This section mainly lists the major accomplishments of each inductee in the Texas wrestling territory.

References

External links 

Texas Wrestling Hall Of Fame at Cagematch.net

2009 establishments in the United States
Awards established in 2009
Organizations based in Fort Worth, Texas
Professional wrestling halls of fame
Professional wrestling-related lists
Halls of fame in Texas